Renaissance at Monroe is a planned community and census-designated place (CDP) in Monroe Township, Middlesex County, New Jersey, United States. It is in the southwest part of the township, bordered to the east by Monroe Manor and to the east by East Windsor Township in Mercer County.

It was first listed as a CDP in the 2020 census with a population of 637.

Demographics

2020 census

Note: the US Census treats Hispanic/Latino as an ethnic category. This table excludes Latinos from the racial categories and assigns them to a separate category. Hispanics/Latinos can be of any race.

References 

Census-designated places in Middlesex County, New Jersey
Census-designated places in New Jersey
Monroe Township, Middlesex County, New Jersey